Paul Barber (born 18 March 1951) is an English actor from Toxteth, Liverpool. In a career spanning more than 45 years, he is best known for playing Denzil in Only Fools and Horses and Horse in The Full Monty.

Early life 
Barber was taken into care at the age of seven, following the death of his mother, Margret, from tuberculosis. His mother was from Middlesbrough. His father, a Sierra Leone Creole, died when Paul (or Paddy as he was then known) and his brothers Brian, Paul, Mike and sisters Claudette and Lorraine were very young. Whilst he was in care, he was abused both physically and mentally. He notes that he has suffered like others, but channelled his emotions into acting.

Acting career 
Barber began on the stage in the musical Hair. His first major TV role was as Sam "Lucky" Ubootu in the 1974 ITV Playhouse production Lucky, set in Liverpool and made by Granada TV. He then played the flamboyant but vicious gang boss Malleson in the off-beat BBC Birmingham-based series Gangsters from 1975 to 1978. He played Louis St John in four episodes of I Didn't Know You Cared from 1976 to 1978. A later starring role was alongside Philip Whitchurch in the mid-1980s ITV comedy series The Brothers McGregor.

Barber has worked extensively in British TV, such as in To the Manor Born (1979) as a Jamaican steel band musician; Minder (1980) as Willie Reynolds in episode Don't Tell Them Willie Boy was Here; Only Fools and Horses (1981–2003); Boys from the Blackstuff (1982); and as Malcolm in The Front Line;

In 1991, he played Earl Preston, a football coach, in the BBC Screen One television play, Alive and Kicking. Three years later, he appeared as ill-fated social worker Ian McVerry in an episode of Cracker opposite Robbie Coltrane and Liam Cunningham, and he played Greg Salter in Brookside (1994).

Barber made a guest appearance in the first episode of The Green Green Grass— a spin-off from Only Fools and Horses. He was best known for his role in Only Fools and Horses, and still attends fan conventions for the show.

In 2008, he had a small part in the long-running ITV soap opera Coronation Street playing a club owner, Nelson, an acquaintance of Vernon Tomlin.

In Terry Pratchett's Going Postal (2010) he played a pin-fanatic shop owner. He also starred in White Van Man as Hooky Pete in February 2012.

In 2012, Barber played the role of Captain in Sky 1's Sinbad. In 2014, He appeared as Captain Jack Parrot in Death in Paradise on 18 February 2014.

Barber also appeared as Fieldhouse in Home from Home in the 2016 pilot episode, and he appeared again in the 2018 series. In 2017, Barber guest-starred in two episodes of the CBBC Tracy Beaker spin-off series The Dumping Ground as a homeless man, George.

The following year, Barber appeared in two episodes of Casualty as Ernest Maxwell, reprising the role in 2019. He had previously appeared in Casualty a number of times as other characters.

Film work 
He had small roles in the big-screen version of Porridge (1979) and The Long Good Friday (1980).

Barber's best known role was playing one of the stripping steelworkers in the 1997 film The Full Monty. He reunited with Full Monty co-star Robert Carlyle and Samuel L. Jackson in the Liverpool-based crime film The 51st State (2001).

In 2002, He played the role of Luther in the drama The Hidden City. In 2006, he starred in the feature film Dead Man's Cards, Barber again returned to Merseyside, playing the part of Paul, the head doorman at a Liverpool club.

In the 2014 film One Night in Istanbul, Barber plays a cabbie who is down on his luck and with his friend, Tommy, strikes a deal with a local gangster that allows them to take their young sons to watch Liverpool Football Club play in Turkey.

Paul Barber was cast alongside fellow UK comedy stars Alexei Sayle and Ricky Tomlinson in 2017's Gloves off. He also appears in the 2022 crime action thriller film Renegades.

Personal life
Barber was awarded an honorary doctorate from Liverpool John Moores University in July 2011 for 'outstanding contribution to the performing arts'. He lives in Clacton, Essex.

Filmography

Film

Television

References

External links 
 
 Rare British Television Reviews – The Front Line
 BBC article

1951 births
English people of Irish descent
English people of Sierra Leonean descent
Black British male actors
English male film actors
Sierra Leone Creole people
Male actors from Liverpool
Outstanding Performance by a Cast in a Motion Picture Screen Actors Guild Award winners
Living people
British male comedy actors